Tredethy is a house and estate in the civil parish of St Mabyn, Cornwall, UK, at Grid reference SX 06 71. It occupies seven acres and is one of a number of small manor houses in the parish all built in the 16th and 17th centuries. The house was extensively restored in 1892 by the  prominent Cornish architect Silvanus Trevail.

This was the seat of the Rev. Charles Peters (1690–1774), a Hebrew scholar.

Later it became the home of Prince Chula Chakrabongse of Thailand who married Elizabeth Hunter, an English woman in 1938. Their daughter, Mom Rajawongse Narisa Chakrabhongse, was born in 1956.
 They lived at Tredethy in the 1940s and 1950s. At Bodmin there is an ornate granite drinking bowl which serves the needs of thirsty dogs at the entrance to Bodmin's Priory car park which was donated by Prince Chula.
There is a similar granite drinking bowl at Mitchem’s Corner in Cambridge, donated in 1934 in memory of Prince Chula’s dog called Tony.

In the 1960s Tredethy was converted to a hotel with 11 en-suite bedrooms.

most recently,

This was the Home of the mombelli family, till the mombelli’s left the residence in 2020 and moved to SW cornwall, till 2020 it was used as a family home and as a country house hotel.

References

Grade II listed buildings in Cornwall
Houses in Cornwall